The Benevolents is a Canadian short documentary film, directed by Sarah Baril Gaudet and released in 2021. An exploration of contemporary loneliness and the importance of human social connection, the film is a portrait of various people who are training to become volunteers for Tel-Aide, a crisis hotline in Montreal, Quebec.

The film premiered at the 2021 Festival international du cinéma francophone en Acadie. It was subsequently distributed principally through Op-Docs, The New York Times's streaming platform for documentaries.

Awards
At the 2022 Hot Docs Canadian International Documentary Festival, the film received an honorable mention for the Betty Youson Award for Best Canadian Short Documentary. It was a nominee for Best Short Documentary at the 2022 IDA Awards, and a Canadian Screen Award nominee for Best Short Documentary at the 11th Canadian Screen Awards in 2023.

References

External links

2021 films
2021 short documentary films
Canadian short documentary films
2020s French-language films
2020s Canadian films
French-language Canadian films